Frima Studio is a Canadian digital entertainment studio. Headquartered in Quebec City, Quebec and founded in 2003, the company develops video games across a variety of platforms. Frima also produces animation for television and film.

In 2010, Frima was noted as one of the fastest-growing companies in Canada by Profit.

History
The company was founded in Quebec City in 2003 by Steve Couture, Philippe Bégin and Christian Daigle in the midst of the dotcom crash. Originally, the name Frima comes from the French word "frimas," which is the layer of frost that forms around windows during winter. This is due to the fact that the studio made its debut in the poorly-insulated apartment that the three founders shared. Frima has notably developed flash games for many famous intellectual properties, including Harry Potter and Looney Tunes.

In 2008, Frima acquired Humagade, a mobile game developer. Shortly after, the studio was merged with the main Frima office.

In 2009, with the opening of a second studio in Matane, Frima had an estimate of 265 full-time employees. Later that year, they became the beneficiary of a $2 million joint investment between the company and the Government of Quebec to fund employee training. This resulted in the creation of 147 new jobs over the next three years, and the maintenance of 201 pre‐existing production‐oriented jobs.

In June 2011, the Matane studio was shut down. Frima cited the difficulty of attracting talent to the area as the primary reason. In August of that year, Frima acquired Volta, an animation, concept art and design studio. The division was sold to Keywords Studios for $5.25 million in 2016. Frima stated the profit would allow them to further focus on internal animation. During Frima's ownership, the two collaborated on a number of projects, such as the 2015 Bionicle relaunch, where Volta handled the animated television series while Frima developed the mobile video game.

In 2014, the company's Quebec City head office moved to the former television studios of TQS owned-and-operated station CFAP-TV in the Saint-Roch neighbourhood. By then, Frima had grown to over 350 employees. In April 2015, the company received a $7.5 million investment from Média-Participations and Fonds de solidarité FTQ. The following November, Frima opened an additional studio in Montreal.

On February 22, 2017, the Montreal studio was shuttered as Frima laid off 60 employees. The company's total headcount was reduced to 250. The following April, Couture stepped down as CEO. Daigle replaced him until Martin Carrier was appointed as CEO and president in August 2017.

Softography

Original productions

Console games

Virtual worlds and CMMOs

Social and web games

Smartphone games

Animation

Development services

Virtual worlds and CMMOs

Social and web games

Console games

Smartphone games

Animation and special FX

Technologies
Frima has been working with the latest version of Adobe Flash Player. Frima was selected by Adobe as a Molehill pre-release partner.

The SnowStorm Gaming Grid allows the creation of customizable social games and MMOGs.

The NorthStar Dashboard is a set of data tracking tools used to monitor key metrics linked to an online application.

The IceField 3D Engine allows the creation of in-browser 3D experiences using hardware acceleration.

The IceWave 2D Platform is used to easily and seamlessly deploy a project on multiple platforms.

References

External links
 Frima Studio's official website
 An article on Rock Paper Sumo and Frima Studio 
 An article on A Space Shooter for 2 Bucks!

Canadian companies established in 2003
2003 establishments in Quebec
Companies based in Quebec City
Video game companies established in 2003
Video game companies of Canada
Video game development companies
Canadian animation studios